KBTR may refer to:

 the ICAO code for Baton Rouge Metropolitan Airport
 KBTR-CD, a television station (channel 36) licensed to Baton Rouge, Louisiana, United States